Dominik Meffert and Philipp Oswald were the defending champions but decided not to participate.
Marcel Felder and Carlos Salamanca won the title, defeating Alejandro Falla and Eduardo Struvay 7–6(5), 6–4 in the final.

Seeds

Draw

Draw

External links
 Main Draw

Seguros Bolivar Open Pereira - Doubles
2011 Doubles